Pentaster is a genus of sea stars in the family Oreasteridae. It is also known as the Blunt Arm Sea Star.

Taxonomy 
List of species according to the World Register of Marine Species:
 Pentaster hybridus Döderlein, 1936
 Pentaster obtusatus (Bory de St. Vincent, 1827)

References

Oreasteridae
Taxa named by Ludwig Heinrich Philipp Döderlein